The 1992 Wyoming Cowboys football team represented the University of Wyoming in the 1992 NCAA Division I-A football season. The Cowboys were led by second-year head coach Joe Tiller and played their home games at War Memorial Stadium in Laramie, Wyoming. They finished the season with a 5–7 record overall and a 3–5 record in the Western Athletic Conference to finish tied for 7th in the conference.

Schedule

Roster

References

Wyoming
Wyoming Cowboys football seasons
Wyoming Cowboys football